The Tagore Award is an award given in commemoration of the 150th birth anniversary of the Nobel laureate Rabindranath Tagore (1861–1941) for cultural harmony. Established in 2011 by Government of India, it is given for outstanding achievement in fostering harmony and universalism and values of cultural harmony especially in conflict or extreme situations through innovative systems/strategies and which have an enduring and transformational impact. This award carries an amount of Rupees One Crore (ten million rupees, convertible to foreign currency), a Citation in a Scroll, a Plaque as well as an exquisite traditional handicraft/handloom item. The first award was given in 2012 to Pandit Ravi Shankar by the President of India Pranab Mukherjee. Ravi Shankar died before he could receive the award which was received by his wife Sukanya Shankar.

Music conductor Zubin Mehta received the Tagore Award For Cultural Harmony for the year 2013 in recognition of his outstanding contribution to cultural harmony. On 6 September 2013, President of India Pranab Mukherjee conferred the Tagore Award 2013 to Zubin Mehta at a ceremony held at Rashtrapati Bhawan, New Delhi.

Recipients 

Tagore Award for 2019 is given to Yohei Sasakawa, goodwill ambassador of World Health Organization.

References

Indian awards
Memorials to Rabindranath Tagore
2011 establishments in India